Alfred Casile (1848–1909) was a French landscape and marine painter.

Biography
His mother was from an old, established Marseille family. His father was of Corsican origin and held a high position in the railroad company. At first, he was employed by the dock company but, in 1879, was able to relocate to Paris, where he had his first showing at the Salon in 1880.

Once he had become settled there, he took further lessons from Antoine Guillemet and made the acquaintance of several well known artists, including Camille Pissarro, Alfred Sisley and  Claude Monet. After a lengthy trip to Italy, he returned to Marseille where, in 1891, he married Constance Dutoint, a woman from Brussels he had met in Paris.

He and Constance spent several years in Belgium, where he painted in Bruges, Antwerp, Ghent and many other locations. After going back to Marseille, he slowly became addicted to absinthe, and died of its effects in 1909.

Their youngest daughter would marry the painter, Louis-Mathieu Verdilhan. His granddaughter, is an honorary Sociétaire of the Comédie-Française.

A street in Marseille is named after him.

References

Further reading 
 André Alauzen and Laurent Noet, Dictionnaire des peintres et sculpteurs de Provence-Alpes-Côte d'Azur, Jeanne Laffitte, 2006 
 Gérald Schurr, Alfred Casile, Éditions de l'Amateur, 1996

External links 

More works by Casile @ ArtNet

1848 births
1909 deaths
Artists from Marseille
19th-century French painters
French landscape painters
French marine artists
20th-century French painters